Qiao Hong (born November 21, 1968 in Wuhan, Hubei) is a former female Chinese table tennis player. She is now the coach of the women's national table tennis team and a member of the Chinese Olympic Committee.

Table tennis career
She won four Olympic medals including two gold medals. Her ten World Championship medals  included five gold medals. 

She was ranked second by the International Table Tennis Federation (ITTF) for a long time, Qiao Hong and long-time world No. 1 Deng Yaping formed one of the most feared double combos. She joined ITTF Hall of Fame in 2005.

See also
 List of table tennis players
 List of World Table Tennis Championships medalists

References

External links
Chinese Olympic Committee profile
International Table Tennis Federation profile
Liu Guoliang, Zhang Yining inducted into ITTF's Hall of Fame

1968 births
Living people
Chinese female table tennis players
Olympic bronze medalists for China
Olympic gold medalists for China
Olympic silver medalists for China
Olympic table tennis players of China
Table tennis players from Wuhan
Table tennis players at the 1992 Summer Olympics
Table tennis players at the 1996 Summer Olympics
Medalists at the 1996 Summer Olympics
Medalists at the 1992 Summer Olympics
Olympic medalists in table tennis
Asian Games medalists in table tennis
Table tennis players at the 1990 Asian Games
Table tennis players at the 1994 Asian Games
Asian Games gold medalists for China
Asian Games silver medalists for China
Asian Games bronze medalists for China
Medalists at the 1990 Asian Games
Medalists at the 1994 Asian Games